This is a list of notable people who are from Nunavut, Canada, or have spent a large part or formative part of their life in that territory.

A

 Eva Aariak, former Premier of Nunavut
 Susan Aglukark, singer-songwriter
 Leona Aglukkaq, MP, Minister of the Environment for Canada, territorial MLA and minister
 Olayuk Akesuk, territorial politician
 Atuat Akkitirq, filmmaker, actress, and costume designer
 David Alagalak, territorial politician
 Ovide Alakannuark, territorial politician
 Madeleine Allakariallak, musician and television journalist
 Siku Allooloo, writer, artist, and educator
 Titus Allooloo, territorial politician
 Elizabeth Kugmucheak Alooq, artist
 Simeonie Amagoalik, carver
 Jack Anawak, former MP and territorial politician
 Michael Angottitauruq, territorial politician
 Elizabeth Angrnaqquaq, textile artist
 Luke Anguhadluq, artist

 Stephen Angulalik, fur trader and trading post operator
 Moses Appaqaq, territorial politician
 Goo Arlooktoo, territorial politician
 Joe Arlooktoo, territorial politician and artist
 Germaine Arnaktauyok, artist
 Alethea Arnaquq-Baril, filmmaker and activist
 Silas Arngna'naaq, territorial politician
 James Arreak, territorial politician
 James Arvaluk, territorial politician
 Karoo Ashevak, sculptor
 Kenojuak Ashevak, artist
 Kiugak Ashoona, artist
 Pitseolak Ashoona, artist
 Moses Aupaluktuq, territorial politician
 Elizabeth Nutaraluk Aulatjut, artist
 Susan Avingaq, film director, producer, screenwriter, and actress

B

 Levi Barnabas, territorial politician
 Ernie Bernhardt, territorial politician

 Levinia Brown, territorial politician

C

 Charlie Crow, territorial politician and DJ

 Tagak Curley, territorial politician

E

 Edna Elias, Commissioner of Nunavut
 Ron Elliott (politician), territorial politician
 Tommy Enuaraq, territorial politician

 Elijah Erkloo, territorial politician
 Lucassie Etungat, artist
 Mark Evaloarjuk, territorial politician
 Joe Allen Evyagotailak, territorial politician

F

 Kelly Fraser, singer

H

 Ann Meekitjuk Hanson, former Commissioner of Nunavut
 Kenn Harper, historian, teacher, development officer, linguist, and businessman

 Donald Havioyak, territorial politician

I

 Lucie Idlout, rock singer
 Osuitok Ipeelee, sculptor
 Alootook Ipellie, illustrator and writer
 David Iqaqrialu, territorial politician

 Peter Irniq, former Commissioner and territorial politician
 Enoki Irqittuq, territorial politician
 Peter Ittinuar, former MP

J 

 Kingwatsiak Jaw, sculptor

K

 Nancy Karetak-Lindell, former MP
 Peter Kattuk, territorial politician
 Davidee Kavik, artist
 Simeonie Keenainak, accordionist and retired RCMP officer
 Kikkik, Inuit woman charged and acquitted of causing the death of one of her children in starvation times
 Ipeelee Kilabuk, territorial politician
 Peter Kilabuk, territorial politician
 Iyola Kingwatsiak, artist
 Kiviaq (David Ward), lawyer, politician, and former sportsman

 Adamee Komoartok, territorial politician
 Peter Kritaqliluk, Inuit activist
 Zacharias Kunuk, producer and director
 Jose Kusugak, territorial politician, husband of Nellie Kusugak
 Lorne Kusugak, territorial politician
 Michael Kusugak, children's writer and storyteller
 Nellie Kusugak, Deputy Commissioner of Nunavut and former acting Commissioner; wife of Jose Kusugak

L
 Bill Lyall, territorial politician and president of the Arctic Cooperative

M

 Helen Maksagak, former Commissioner of both the Northwest Territories and Nunavut
 Enook Manomie, artist
 Kavavaow Mannomee, artist
 Steve Mapsalak, territorial politician
 Glenn McLean, territorial politician

 Matty McNair, American explorer
 Rebecca Mike, territorial politician
 Kellypalik Mungitok, artist

N

 Nakasuk, founder of Iqaluit
 Patterk Netser, territorial politician
 Kelvin Ng, territorial politician
 John Ningark, territorial politician

 Johnny Ningeongan, territorial politician
 William Noah, territorial politician and artist
 Jobie Nutarak, territorial politician

O

 Kevin O'Brien, territorial politician
 Paul Okalik, former premier
 Abe Okpik, first Inuk to sit on the Northwest Territories Council

 Jessie Oonark, artist
 Elisapee Ootoova, elder and knowledge-keeper
 Stephen Osborne, writer and editor

P

 Charlie Panigoniak, singer-songwriter and guitarist
 Pauloosie Paniloo, territorial politician
 Dennis Patterson, territorial politician
 Enuk Pauloosie, territorial politician
 Lena Pedersen, territorial politician
 Red Pedersen, territorial politician
 Sheouak Petaulassie, artist
 Keith Peterson, territorial politician
 Ed Picco, territorial politician

 Looty Pijamini, Inuit artist
 Peter Pitseolak, photographer, artist and historian
 Annabella Piugattuk, actress
 Annie Pootoogook, artist
 Sharni Pootoogook, printmaker
 Kenoayoak Pudlat, territorial politician
 Pudlo Pudlat, artist
 Ludy Pudluk, territorial politician
 Uriash Puqiqnak, territorial politician and carver

Q
 Andrew Qappik, graphic artist
 Mumilaaq Qaqqaq, politician

R
 Allan Rumbolt, territorial politician

S

 Kakulu Saggiaktok, artist
 Eliyakota Samualie, artist
 Fred Schell, territorial politician
 Elisapee Sheutiapik, mayor of Iqaluit
 Daniel Shewchuk, territorial politician

 David Simailak, territorial politician
 Thomas Suluk, former MP

T

 Tanya Tagaq, singer, songwriter and artist
 Louis Tapardjuk, territorial politician
 Peter Taptuna, territorial politician
 Nalenik Temela, sculptor
 Manitok Thompson, territorial politician
 Irene Avaalaaqiaq Tiktaalaaq, artist

 John Todd, territorial politician
 Kane Tologanak, territorial politician
 Simon Tookoome, artist
 Hunter Tootoo, territorial politician
 Jordin Tootoo, hockey player
 Akesuk Tudlik, artist

U
 Natar Ungalaaq, actor, filmmaker, and sculptor

W

 Sheila Watt-Cloutier, activist and former chair of the Inuit Circumpolar Council
 Rebekah Williams, territorial politician

 Gordon Wray, territorial politician